"Wanradt-Koell Catechism" is a partly preserved book, which is considered as the oldest printed source of Estonian language, as the oldest known examples of written Estonian originate in 13th-century chronicles. The book is compiled by clergymen Simon Wanradt and Johann Koell. The book was published in 1535 in Wittenberg.

Book's excerpts was discovered in 1929 by historian Hellmuth Weiss.

See also
 Timeline of early Estonian publications

References

Further reading
 A. Saareste. Esimese eestikeelse raamatu Wanradt-Kõlli katekismuse keelest (Tartu, 1930)
 Wanradt-Kõlli katekismuse katked a. 1535 (Tartu, 1931)
 H. Weiss. 400-aastane eesti raamat: Wanradt-Koell'i katekismus 1535. aastast  (Tallinn, 1935)
 Eesti wanima raamatu Wanradt-Koelli katekismuse säilinud lehekülgede reproduktsioone ja rekonstruktsioone (Tallinn, 1935)
 H. Weiss. Esimene eesti raamat anno 1535. Wanradt-Koell'i katekismus 1535 aasta (New York, 1956, 2. edition, supplemented)

Estonian books
Estonian language
1535 books